Carrières-sous-Poissy is a commune in the Yvelines department in the Île-de-France region in north-central France.  The town sits on the bank of the Seine River, directly opposite the commune of Poissy.  Notable landmarks in Carrières-sous-Poissy include the Château Champfleury, the Château Vanderbilt and St. Joseph's Church.

Demographics

See also
Communes of the Yvelines department

References

Communes of Yvelines